Dopium is the third solo studio album by Wu-Tang Clan member U-God. The album was released on June 23, 2009. The album features guest appearances from Method Man, Ghostface Killah, GZA, Killah Priest, Raekwon, Cappadonna, Jim Jones, Large Professor, Slaine and Sheek Louch.

Track listing

Charts

References 

U-God albums
2009 albums
Babygrande Records albums
Albums produced by Large Professor